This list is of people who were born or raised in the County of Northumberland, in England. The area covered is the ceremonial county, hence the exclusion of places traditionally regarded as being in Northumberland which are now in Tyne and Wear for administrative and ceremonial purposes. The list is intended to complement :Category:People from Northumberland.

Art and architecture
 Pauline Bewick (born 1935), watercolour painter
 Thomas Bewick (1753–1828), wood engraver, born at Cherryburn, Mickley
 Glenn Brown (born 1966), painter and Turner Prize nominee
 Lancelot "Capability" Brown (1716–1783), landscape architect
 John Clayton (1792–1890), antiquarian and town clerk of Newcastle upon Tyne
 Luke Clennell (1781–1840), engraver
 Archibald Matthias Dunn (1832–1917), Catholic architect, born in Wylam
 Mark Fiennes (1933–2004), photographer
 Noel Forster (1932–2007), abstract painter
 John and Benjamin Green (1789–1852; c. 1807 – 1868), architects
 Hermione Hammond (1910–2005), painter
 John Jackson (1801–1848), wood engraver, born at Ovingham, apprenticed to Thomas Bewick
 Mason Jackson (1819–1903), wood engraver, born at Ovingham
 John Martin (1789–1854), influential English Romantic painter of the nineteenth century, born in Haydon Bridge, his dramatic The Destruction of Sodom and Gomorrah can be seen in the Laing Art Gallery in Newcastle upon Tyne
 Vanessa Raw (born 28 September 1984), artist, born in Hexham
 Willey Reveley (1760–1799), architect
 T. J. Cobden Sanderson (1840–1922), Arts and Crafts Movement artist
 Imogen Stubbs (born 1961), actress and playwright, born in Rothbury
 Stella Vine (born 1969),  English contemporary artist (figurative painting), born in Alnwick

Business
 William George Armstrong, 1st Baron Armstrong (1810–1900), Tyneside industrialist who was the effective founder of the Armstrong Whitworth manufacturing empire
 Emerson Muschamp Bainbridge (1817–1892), founder of Bainbridge Department Store in Newcastle upon Tyne, the first such store in the world (still the largest John Lewis outside London) 
 John Hall (born 1933), property developer and chairman of Newcastle United
 Peter Horbury (born c.1950), car designer
 Charles Algernon Parsons (1854–1931), engineer known for his invention of the steam turbine, buried at Kirkwhelpington
 Lewy Pattinson (1852–1944), Australian businessman, born in Hexham
 John Urpeth Rastrick (1780–1856), steam locomotive builder
 John Wigham Richardson (1837–1908), shipbuilder

Entertainment

Acting
 Daniel Ainsleigh (born 1976), British actor and acting coach, born in Hexham
 Robson Green (born 1964), television actor and singer
 Jean Heywood (born 1921), British actress, appearing in films and television programmes
 Alexander Knox (died 1995), Canadian actor; died at Berwick
 Darren Newton (born 1969), actor and theatre director
 Ben Roberts, television actor
 Ray Stevenson (born 1964), Northern Irish film and television actor; grew up in Cramlington
 Tip Tipping (1958–1993), actor, died in a parachuting accident at Alnwick
 Henry Travers (1874–1965), born in Prudhoe; character actor best known for his roles in Hollywood film productions, most famously as Clarence the angel in It's a Wonderful Life  (1946)
 Kevin Whately (born 1951), English television actor, starring in Auf Wiedersehen, Pet, Peak Practice, Inspector Morse, and Lewis

Broadcasting
 Tony Bastable (1944–2007), children's television presenter and producer
 Ian Peacock, radio presenter
 Sid Waddell (born 1940), English sports commentator and television personality

Comedy
 Alexander Armstrong (born 1970), comedian, actor and television personality

Music
 Darren Allison (born 1968), record producer and musician with The Divine Comedy, Spiritualized and others
 Graham Bell (1948–2008), singer with Skip Bifferty and as a solo artist
 Dave Cliff (born 1944), British jazz guitarist
 Pete Doherty (born 1979), musician with The Libertines and Babyshambles
 China Drum (fl. 1981–2001), punk rock band
 Mark Elder (born 1947), British conductor, currently the music director of The Hallé Orchestra in Manchester, England
 Wilfred Gibson (born 1945), violinist with the Electric Light Orchestra
 John Peacock (c. 1756 – 1817), Northumbrian smallpipes player
 Sting (born 1951), singer with The Police and multi-Grammy Award winning solo artist

Military
 William Wilson Allen (1844–1890), recipient of the Victoria Cross
 Henry Askew (1775–1847), general
 Joe Baker-Cresswell (1901–1997), aide-de-camp to King George VI and High Sheriff of Northumberland
 Sam Browne (1824–1901), British Indian Army general
 Hugh Cairns (1896–1918), recipient of the Victoria Cross
 Francis Crake (1893–1920), soldier and Royal Irish Constabulary officer
 Frederick William Dobson (1886–1935), recipient of the Victoria Cross
 James Bulmer Johnson (1889–1943), recipient of the Victoria Cross
 David Murray-Lyon (1890–1975), British Indian Army general
 James Robb (1895–1968), senior Royal Air Force commander (Air Chief Marshal), and was Commander-in-Chief of Fighter Command from 1945 to 1947
 Richard Been Stannard (1902–1977), recipient of the Victoria Cross
 Tod Sweeney (1919–2001), platoon commander at the Normandy Landings
 Patrick Tonyn (1725–1804), general and colonial governor
 Adam Herbert Wakenshaw (1914–1942), recipient of the Victoria Cross

Nobility
 Æthelfrith of Northumbria (died c. 616), King of Bernicia from c. 593 until c. 616; he was also, beginning c. 604, the first Bernician king to also rule Deira; can be considered, in historical terms, the first Northumbrian king
 Arthur Bigge, 1st Baron Stamfordham (1849–1931), private secretary to Queen Victoria and George V; born at Linden Hall, near Morpeth
 Robert de Ros (1177–1226)
 Margaret Douglas (1515–1578)
 Waltheof, Earl of Dunbar (died 1182)
 Gospatric II, Earl of Lothian (died 1138)
 Gospatric III, Earl of Lothian (died 1166)
 Forster baronets (established 1620)
 Ida of Bernicia (died 559), Ida or Ida the Flamebearer, was a ruler (probably the founder) of the Anglo-Saxon kingdom of Bernicia between 547 and 559
 Malcolm III of Scotland (died 1093), died at Alnwick
 Henry 'Hotspur' Percy (c. 1364 – 1403), son of the 1st Earl of Northumberland
 Henry Percy, 1st Earl of Northumberland (1341–1408)
 Henry Percy, 2nd Earl of Northumberland (1392–1455)
 Henry Percy, 5th Earl of Northumberland (1477–1527)
 William Widdrington, 1st Baron Widdrington (1610–1651)

Politics
 Peter Atkinson (born 1943), Conservative MP for Hexham
 Gordon Banks (born 1955), Labour MP for Ochil and South Perthshire
 Alan Beith (born 1943), currently the Member of Parliament for Berwick-upon-Tweed
 Josephine Butler (1828–1906), feminist activist, born at Milfield
 Ronnie Campbell (born 1943), Labour MP for Blyth Valley
 John Candlish (1816–1874), Liberal MP for Sunderland
 Hilton Dawson (born 1953), Labour MP for Lancaster and Wyre
 William Elliott, Baron Elliott of Morpeth (born 1920), Conservative politician
 Charles Fenwick (1850–1918), Lib-Lab MP for Wansbeck and Trades Union Congress leader
 Charles Grey, 2nd Earl Grey (1764–1845), Whig Prime Minister (1830–1834)
 Antony Lambton (1922–2006), Viscount Lambton, was the controversial Tory Member of Parliament for Berwick-upon-Tweed from 1951 until 1973
 Denis Murphy (born 1940), Labour MP for Wansbeck
 Jeremy Purvis (born 1974), Liberal Democrat MSP, and youngest person in Scottish Parliament at time of election
 John Campbell Renton (born 1814), Member of Parliament for Berwick-upon-Tweed 
 Joseph Richardson (1755–1803), Whig activist
 Ralph Widdrington (1640–1718), MP for Berwick-upon-Tweed

Religion
 Martin of Alnwick (d. 1336), Franciscan friar and theologian
 William Bickerton (1815–1905), founder of The Church of Jesus Christ (Bickertonite)
 Bolton Stafford Bird (1840–1924), clergyman
 Benedict Biscop (628–690), abbot
 Charles Lisle Carr (1871–1942), Church of England bishop
 Cedd (c. 620 – 664), evangelist and saint
 John Farrar (1802–1884), Methodist clergyman and writer
 John of Hexham (c. 1160 – 1209), English chronicler, known to us merely as the author of a work called the Historia XXV. annorum, which continues the Historia regum attributed to Symeon of Durham, and contains an account of English events from 1130 to 1153
 Edward Knott (1581–1656), most important English Jesuit of his day 
 William Turnbull Leach (1805–1886), clergyman and academic
 Chad of Mercia (died 672), abbot, bishop and saint
 Robert Morrison (1782–1834), missionary in China
 Joseph Parker (1830–1902), Congregationalist preacher and writer
 Richard of Hexham (fl. 1141), English chronicler, who became prior of Hexham about 1141, and died between 1163 and 1178
 Nicholas Ridley (1500–1555), bishop and martyr of the Marian Persecutions
 Ailred of Rievaulx (1110–1167), writer and saint
 Robert of Holy Island (died 1283), Bishop of Durham
 Joseph Stevenson (1806–1895), archivist and Jesuit
 Rowland Taylor (1510–1555), martyr of the Marian Persecutions
 Henry Baker Tristram (1822–1906), clergyman and Bible scholar
 John of Trokelowe (fl. 14th century), Benedictine and chronicler
 Keith Ward (born 1938), Regius Professor of Divinity at Oxford, born in Hexham
 William of Alnwick (c. 1275 – 1333), Franciscan theologian and Bishop of Giovinazzo
 N. T. Wright (born 1948), Bishop of Durham

Science and medicine
 George Biddell Airy (1801–1892), mathematician and Astronomer Royal
 Martyn Amos (born 1971), Senior Lecturer in Computing and Public Engagement Fellow at Manchester Metropolitan University; expert on natural computation and DNA computing; born in Hexham
 Charles Baring, 2nd Baron Howick of Glendale (born 1937), arboriculturalist and plant collector
 Thomas Gibson (died 1562), printer and physician, born in Morpeth 
 Timothy Hackworth (1786–1850), steam locomotive engineer
 William Hewson (1739–1774), 18th-century surgeon, anatomist and physiologist;  sometimes referred to as the 'father of haematology'
 Andrew Karney (born 1942), electrical engineer
 Frank Lees (1931–1999), chemical engineer; professor at Loughborough University; noted for his contribution to the field of industrial safety
 Prideaux John Selby (1788–1867), ornithologist
 James Calvert Spence (1892–1954), paediatrician
 George Stephenson (1781–1848), steam locomotive engineer
 Ralph Tate (1840–1901), botanist
 William Turner (1508–1568), pioneer of ornithology and botany as sciences
 Donald I. Williamson (born 1922), zoologist

Sport

Athletics
 Jim Alder (born 1940), Commonwealth Games gold medal winning marathon runner
 Vanessa Raw (born 1984), professional English triathlete, and member of the British Olympic Triathlon Academy Squad, born in Hexham

Cricket
 Norman Graham (born 1943), cricketer who played for Kent, born at Hexham
 Ken Graveney (born 1924), English cricketer who played for and captained Gloucestershire, born in Hexham
 Tom Graveney (born 1927), former English cricketer; President of the Marylebone Cricket Club for 2004-5; played for England in 79 Tests; a Wisden Cricketer of the Year in 1953; born in Riding Mill
 Steve Harmison (born 1978), Durham and England cricketer
 John Wake (born 1953), Bedfordshire cricketer

Football
NB: Clubs listed are those at which the player made 100 or more League appearances or, if not applicable, club at which they made most appearances.
 Chris Adamson (born 1978), played for St Patrick's Athletic
 Jimmy Adamson (born 1929), played for and managed Burnley
 Jimmy Allen (1913–1979), played for Queens Park Rangers
 Ben Alnwick (born 1987), played for Sunderland
 John Angus (1938–2021), played for Burnley
 Colin Ayre (born 1956), played in the English, Dutch and Austrian football leagues
 Bob Bearpark (1943–1996), Canada men's national soccer team coach
 Paul Boertien (born 1979), played for Derby County
 Martin Brittain (born 1984), plays for Gateshead
 John Brodie (born 1947), played for Port Vale
 Alan Brown (1914–1996), played for and managed Burnley, managed Sunderland
 James Brown (born 1987), Hartlepool United F C striker, born in Cramlington
 Joe Brown (born 1929), played for A.F.C. Bournemouth
 Steve Bruce (born 1960), manager of Sunderland, played for Gillingham, Norwich City & Manchester United, born in Corbridge
 James Bumphrey (1885–?), played for Birmingham
 Mick Buxton (born 1943), managed Huddersfield Town and Sunderland
 Jack Callender (1923–2001), played for Gateshead
 John Callender (1903–1980), played for Gateshead
 Tom Callender (1920–2002), played for Gateshead
 Graham Carr (born 1944), played for and managed Northampton Town
 William Carrier (1887-after 1911), played for Birmingham
 Tony Carss (born 1976), played for Huddersfield Town
 Stuart Chapman (born 1951), played for Port Vale
 Bobby Charlton (born 1937), played for Manchester United
 Jack Charlton (born 1935), played for Leeds United
 George Cook (born 1904), played for Torquay United
 Billy Cowell (born 1902), played for Huddersfield Town and Hartlepool United
 Jack Coxford (1901–1978), played for Bournemouth & Boscombe Athletic
 Steve Davis (born 1968), played for Burnley and Luton Town
 Andy Duncan, played for Cambridge United
 Shaun Elliott (born 1957), played for Sunderland
 David Fairhurst (1906–1972), played for Newcastle United
 Ian Ferguson (born 1968), Scottish, played for Raith Rovers, ended his professional career in 2004 with Berwick Rangers
 Steve Finney (born 1973), played for Swindon Town
 Bobby Flavell (born 1956), played for Halifax Town
 Fraser Forster (born 1988), plays for Newcastle United
 Bill Fraser (1907-?), played for Southampton
 Allan Gauden (born 1944), played for Sunderland
 Robert Gordon (1917–1940), played for Huddersfield Town
 Wilf Grant (1920–1990), played for Cardiff City
 Kevin Henderson (born 1974), played for Hartlepool United
 Peter Henderson (born 1952), played for Chester
 Bob Hewitson (1884–1957), played for Crystal Palace
 Rob Hindmarch (1961–2002), played for Sunderland and Derby County
 Jimmy Isaac (born 1916), played for Hartlepools United
 Derek Jefferson (born 1948), played for Ipswich Town
 Jimmy Kelly (1931–2003), played for Watford and Blackpool
 Ray Kennedy (born 1951), played for Arsenal and Liverpool
 George King (born 1923), played for Gillingham
 Ray King (born 1924), played for Port Vale
 Dan Kirkup (born 1988), plays for Workington
 Joe Kirkup (born 1939), played for West Ham United and Southampton
 Mel Lintern (born 1950), played for Carlisle United
 Joe Lynn (born 1925), played for Rochdale
 Jamie McClen (born 1979), played for Gateshead
 William McCourty (1884-after 1909), played for Birmingham
 Billy McGlen (1921–1999), played for Manchester United and Lincoln City
 George Milburn (1910–1980), played for Leeds United and Chesterfield
 Jack Milburn (1908–1979), played for Leeds United
 Jackie Milburn (1924–1988), played for Newcastle United
 Jim Milburn (1919–1985), played for Leeds United and Bradford Park Avenue
 Stanley Milburn (born 1926), played for Chesterfield, Leicester City and Rochdale
 Harry Mills (born 1922), played for Huddersfield Town
 Bob Morton (1906–1990), played for Port Vale
 Malcolm Musgrove (1933–2007), played for West Ham United
 Brian O'Neil (born 1944), played for Burnley and Southampton
 Graeme Owens (born 1988), played for Middlesbrough, born in Cramlington
 John Potts (born 1904), played for Port Vale
 Peter Ramage (born 1983), played for Newcastle United
 Jimmy Richardson (1911–1964), played for Newcastle United and Huddersfield Town
 Joe Richardson (1908–1977), played for Newcastle United
 John Ritchie (born 1944), played for Port Vale
 Joe Robinson (1919–1991), played for Hartlepools United
 Jock Rutherford (1884–1963), played for Newcastle United and Woolwich Arsenal
 John Shiel (born 1917), played for Huddersfield Town
 Andy Sinton (born 1966), played for Brentford and Queens Park Rangers
 George Stephenson (1900–1971), played for Aston Villa
 Trevor Steven (born 1963), played for Everton and Rangers
 Bob Stokoe (1930–2004), played for Newcastle United and later managed Sunderland A.F.C.
 Eric Tait (born 1951), played and managed for Berwick Rangers
 Martin Taylor (born 1979), plays for Birmingham City
 Steven Taylor (born 1986), plays for Newcastle United
 David Thompson (born 1968), played for Millwall
 Joe Tulip played for Queen of the South F.C.
 Shaun Vipond (born 1988), plays for Workington
 Tommy Walker (1923–2005), played for Oldham Athletic
 Dave Walton (born 1973), played for Shrewsbury Town and Crewe Alexandra
 Jimmy Wardhaugh (1929–1978), played for Heart of Midlothian
 Norman Wilkinson (born 1931), played for York City
 Billy Wilson (born 1946), played for Blackburn Rovers and Portsmouth

Horse racing
 Jonathan E. Pease (born 1952), Thoroughbred racehorse trainer
 Nicky Richards (born 1956), National Hunt racehorse trainer

Other
 Kenneth Ferrie (born 1978), golfer
 Gavin Kerr (born 1977), lived in Berwick for most of his childhood; played professional rugby, a regular in the Scotland rugby team, has 36 caps and 1 try
 Gary Robson (born 1967), World Darts Trophy winning darts player
 Craig Smith (born 1978), lived in Berwick for most of his childhood and attended Berwick County High School; played professional rugby union for the Scotland rugby team with 18 caps
 Matthew Wells, Olympic rower, brother of Peter Wells 
 Peter Wells, Olympic rower, brother of Matthew Wells

Writers
 Kate Adie (born 1945), print and broadcast journalist
 Ruth Ainsworth (1908–1984), children's writer of the Rufty Tufty Golliwog series 
 Richard Armstrong (1903–1986), novelist and historian
 John Blackburn (1923–1993), novelist who wrote thrillers, horror novels, including The Flame and the Wind (1967)
 Robert Blakey (1795–1878), radical journalist and philosopher born in Manchester Street, Morpeth 
 John Brown (1715–1766), religious writer and playwright
 Richard Burridge (born 1951), screenwriter
 Ann Cook (fl. 1760), innkeeper and author of Professed cookery, see Hannah Glasse 
 Samuel Edward Cook (died 1856), travel writer
 Catherine Cookson (1906–1998), author, resided at Corbridge
 Gabriel Fielding (1916–1986), pen name of Alan Gabriel Barnsley, British novelist whose works include In the Time of Greenbloom, The Birthday King, Through Streets Broad and Narrow and The Women of Guinea Lane
 John Gardner (1926–2007), creator of Boysie Oakes series and author of James Bond books
 Wilfrid Wilson Gibson (1878–1962), British poet, associated with World War I, born in Hexham
 Hannah Glasse (1708–1770), cookery writer
 M. B. Halbeck (1936–1989), poet
 Nigel Hamilton (born 1944), biographer and academic
 John Cuthbert Hedley (1830–1915), religious writer
 John Hodgson, wrote his History of Northumberland during his incumbency at Kirkwhelpington, 1823–34 
 Eric Pringle, children's writer
 James Runciman (1852–1891), journalist
 Steven Runciman (1903–2000), historian of the Middle Ages
 William M. Timlin (1892–1943), author and architect
 Hugh Trevor-Roper (1914–2003), historian of Early Modern Britain and Nazi Germany
 Veronica Wedgwood (1910–1997), historian of the English Civil War

Other people
 John Ashenden (d. in or before 1368?), astrologer, born Northumberland 
 Bernard Bosanquet (1848–1923), philosopher and political theorist
 John Busby (1765–1867), surveyor and civil engineer
 Ned Coulson, celebrity of Haydon Bridge, noted for his wonderful swiftness of foot 
 Grace Darling (1815–1842), heroine of a celebrated maritime rescue
 Richard Duncan (died 1819), judge and politician in Upper Canada
 Matthew Festing (born 1949), Grand Master of the Sovereign Military Order of Malta
 Philip Hunter (born 1940), Schools Adjudicator for England
 Robert Huntley (1920–2001), first Head of Scotland Yard's Bomb Squad 
 Ralph Hush (1779–1860), convict sent to Australia
 Jonathan Martin (1782–1838), arsonist of York Minster
 John Minto (1822–1915), American pioneer, sheep farmer, and Republican representative in the state legislature, born in Wylam
 William Peel (born 1875), British colonial administrator who became the Governor of Hong Kong
 Natalie Pike (born 1983), FHM High Street Honey winner and subsequent glamour model; used to live in Berwick
 William Smith (1775–?), mariner and explorer
 Edward Stamp (1814–1872), mariner and colonialist
 John Stevens, Baron Stevens of Kirkwhelpington (born 1942), whose career included head of the Metropolitan Police Service, and Chancellor of Northumbria University
 Robert Whinham (1776–1861), nurseryman; around the 1830s, bred the red gooseberry Whinham's Industry, which was given the RHS Award of Garden Merit in 1915 and 1993 

Northumberland
Northumberland